Living Legend: Certified D-Boy is an independent album by Master P under his new imprint, Guttar Music.  It released on November 29, 2005 and saw Master P make a return to his "Ice Cream Man" persona. Although he released the album Ghetto Bill earlier that year, he released this album to raise relief funds for the victims of Hurricane Katrina.  It has independently sold over 75,000 copies on Sound Scan and includes the single "Cookie Money," featuring P's cousin and fellow New No Limit/Guttar Music rapper Black.

Track listing

Chart Positions

External links
Track listings at ArtistDirect.com

References

2005 albums
Master P albums